Rozina Sini is a radio presenter on the BBC Asian Network born in Bradford, England.

University and early career in commercial radio
Sini started in commercial radio at the age of fifteen presenting a range of shows. She completed a degree in broadcast journalism before going to work in local radio stations in Lincoln and Leicester.

Rozina Sini on the BBC
Sini joined the BBC Asian Network as a news reporter in June 2001 at the time of the General Election and reported the aftermath of the 2001 September 11 attacks and in October 2002 was promoted to senior broadcast journalist.

In 2002, she travelled to India for BBC Radio Five Live and the BBC Asian Network to cover India's equivalent of the Oscars.
She also covered the 7 July 2005 London bombings and the earthquakes in Pakistan.

Since 15 May 2006 she has been presenting The Wrap on the BBC Asian Network from 12:00pm to 12:30pm weekdays described as being "a new type of Urban Journalism". As of January 2009 she presents 2 editions of The Wrap every weekday. From 20 April 2009 The Wrap was renamed simply as Asian Network Reports and goes out at 12:30pm to 1:00pm and 6:00pm to 6:30pm. (Monday - Friday).

In 2011, Sini joined Clive Myrie to discuss their career progression at a Move on Up workshop organised by the Broadcasting, Entertainment, Cinematograph and Theatre Union (BECTU) for black and minority ethnic (BME) media professionals.

In 2012, Sini was shortlisted in the Media category of the Asian Women of Achievement Awards.

Biography
Rozina Sini Biography - BBC Press Office

References

English radio presenters
Living people
Year of birth missing (living people)
BBC Asian Network presenters
English people of Indian descent